Kenneth or Kenny Milne may refer to:

 Kenny Milne (footballer) (born 1979), Scottish former footballer
 Kenny Milne (rugby union) (born 1961), former Scotland rugby union player
 Frank Kenneth Milne  (1885–1980), architect, known as F. Kenneth Milne, architect of the refurbishment of the Regal Theatre, Kensington Park and other buildings in South Australia